Ahmed Abelrahman (born 26 May 1996) is an Egyptian judoka.

In 2015, he won the gold medal in the men's 60 kg event at the 2015 African Games held in Brazzaville, Congo.

He competed at the 2016 Summer Olympics in Rio de Janeiro, in the men's 60 kg. He lost in the first round.

At the 2021 African Judo Championships held in Dakar, Senegal, he won the gold medal in the men's 66 kg event.

References

External links 
 

1996 births
Living people
Egyptian male judoka
Olympic judoka of Egypt
Judoka at the 2016 Summer Olympics
African Games gold medalists for Egypt
African Games medalists in judo
Competitors at the 2015 African Games
21st-century Egyptian people